Strange Hobby is an uncredited cover album by Arjen Anthony Lucassen, released in 1996. The album and the booklet contained no information about Lucassen and did not explain who was responsible for the recordings, to make the album even more "strange".

The album features covers of songs that have influenced Lucassen's musical development, mainly from the 1960s. As he did in his solo album Pools of Sorrow, Waves of Joy, Lucassen makes all the vocals and all the instruments (except drums and synthesizer), and arranged all the songs himself.

The album was re-released on July 8, 2016 with four previously unreleased bonus tracks; this time, Lucassen was officially credited as the artist.

Track listing

Commercial reception 
The album was a commercial loss, partially because Lucassen was not well known at that time (his success really started with Into the Electric Castle). Years later, Arjen stated "it may not be smart from a commercial point of view, but it was fun".

References 

Arjen Anthony Lucassen albums
1993 albums
Psychedelic rock albums by Dutch artists
Covers albums